Strophanthus sarmentosus grows as either a deciduous shrub or as a liana up to  long, with a stem diameter up to . Its fragrant flowers feature a white to purple corolla, red or purple-streaked on the inside. Strophanthus sarmentosus is native from west and central tropical Africa to Uganda and Angola. Vernacular names for the plant include spider tresses and poison arrow vine. Its habitat is forested areas from sea level to  altitude.

The numerous local medicinal uses of S. sarmentosus include treatment of joint pain, head lice, eye conditions and venereal disease. The plant has also been used as arrow poison. Botanist John Baldwin discovered that Strophanthus sarmentosus was a natural source of the steroid hormone cortisone and was used in the early manufacture of cortisone-based drugs.

Gallery

References

sarmentosus
Flora of Africa
Plants described in 1802
Plants used in traditional African medicine